Defending champion Martina Navratilova and her partner Pam Shriver defeated Barbara Potter and Sharon Walsh in the final, 6–0, 7–6 to win the doubles tennis title at the 1981 Avon Championships. It was Navratilova's fourth Tour Finals doubles title, and Shriver's first.

Billie Jean King and Navratilova were the reigning champions, but King did not qualify this year.

Draw

References
 Official Results Archive (ITF)
 Official Results Archive (WTA)

1981 WTA Tour
Doubles